Lomovo is a rural locality (a selo) and the administrative center of Lomovskoye Rural Settlement, Korochansky District, Belgorod Oblast, Russia. The population was 904 as of 2010. There are 8 streets.

Geography 
Lomovo is located 21 km southwest of Korocha (the district's administrative centre) by road. Gremyachye is the nearest rural locality.

References 

Rural localities in Korochansky District